David Francis Duncan (22 February 1923 – 31 August 2007) was a British diplomat. During World War II he was an officer in the Royal Artillery and was mentioned in despatches. After the war he entered the Diplomatic Service and served both as the 8th United Kingdom Ambassador to Nicaragua from 1974 to 1976 and as British counsellor to the Disarmament Conference from 1971 to 1974.

References

1923 births
2007 deaths
People educated at Eton College
Alumni of Trinity College, Cambridge
Royal Artillery officers
Ambassadors of the United Kingdom to Nicaragua
British Army personnel of World War II